is a passenger railway station in located in the city of Higashiōsaka,  Osaka Prefecture, Japan, operated by the private railway operator Kintetsu Railway.  It is the nearest station to Higashi Osaka Hanazono Rugby Stadium.

Lines
Higashi-Hanazono Station is served by the Nara Line, and is located 5.8 rail kilometers from the starting point of the line at Fuse Station and 11.9 kilometers from Ōsaka Namba Station.

Station layout
The station consists of two elevated 10-car length island platforms serving four tracks, with the station building underneath. Higashi-Hanazono Inspection Depot is connected from the siding tracks numbered 1 and 3.

Platforms

Adjacent stations

When major events are held at Higashi Osaka Hanazono Rugby Stadium, some express trains and some rapid express trains stop at the station.

History
The station opened on 22 November 1929, at the same time as Hanazono Rugby Stadium. The station at the time was only used during the rugby game season, and was named .

In 1941, Osaka Electric Tramway merged with Sangu Kyuko Electric Railway and became a station of Kansai Kyuko Electric Railway. In 1944, Kankyu became Kintetsu and the station became part of Kintetsu. On 10 December 1950, the station was renamed . In 1967, the station was renamed Higashi-Hanazono. Also in 1967, Higashi-Hanazono Depot was completed.

In 2010, the platform grade separation for "down" trains (towards Kintetsu Nara) was completed. In 2014, the platform grade separation for "up" trains (towards Ōsaka Namba) was completed.

Passenger statistics
In fiscal 2018, the station was used by an average of 19,107 passengers daily.

Surrounding area
Higashi Osaka Hanazono Rugby Stadium
Hanazono Central Park
Higashi-Hanazono Inspection Depot

See also
 List of railway stations in Japan

References

External links

 Higashi-Hanazono Station 

Railway stations in Japan opened in 1929
Railway stations in Osaka Prefecture
Higashiōsaka